Mease Dunedin Hospital is a hospital in Dunedin, Florida. It features an ER department, a Psychological Department under the Florida Mental Health Act, and has four floors.

References 
  April 16, 2011.

Hospital buildings completed in 1937
Hospitals in Florida
Buildings and structures in Dunedin, Florida